Mark Ouimet is a Republican politician and served in the Michigan House of Representatives from the 52nd district covering Washtenaw County, Michigan for one term.

Personal life and education
Ouimet was born and raised in Washtenaw County, Michigan.  He received a degree from the unaccredited Northwood Institute (since renamed Northwood University and became accredited), and received a bachelor's and master's degree from the unaccredited LaSalle University in Louisiana, a diploma mill closed by the FBI in July 1996. He later served as Chancellor and COO of Northwood University from 1991 to 2002.

He is married to Donna, and together they have two children named Mark and Courtney.

Political career
Ouimet served as a member of the Ann Arbor city council from 1988 to 1992, and served on the Washtenaw County Board of Commissioners.

In 2010, he won election in the 52nd district against Christine Green; Ouimet had 21,462 votes (51.6 percent) to Green's 20,027 (48.1 percent). During his term, Ouimet was a member of the Accommodations Ordinance Commission, Emergency Medical Services Commission, Money Purchase Pension Plan, Retirement Commission, Workforce Development Board, and the Washtenaw Economic Development Council.

In 2011, he endorsed Mitt Romney for the 2012 United States presidential election.

In 2012, he faced Saline Mayor Gretchen Driskell, a Democrat, for reelection and lost. Driskell received 26,646 votes (52.9%), while Ouimet received 23,609 votes (46.8%).

Notes

External links
Official website
Michigan Vote entry

Northwood University alumni
Politicians from Ann Arbor, Michigan
Republican Party members of the Michigan House of Representatives
Living people
County commissioners in Michigan
Michigan city council members
People from Washtenaw County, Michigan
La Salle University alumni
Year of birth missing (living people)
20th-century American politicians
21st-century American politicians